Betty Jean Owens (born 1940) is an African American woman who was brutally raped by four white men in Tallahassee, Florida in 1959. Her trial was significant in Florida, and the South as a whole, because the white men were given life sentences for their crimes.  Prior to Owens' case, sentences of this severity had not been imposed in the South on white men accused of raping black women. For example, in the case of Recy Taylor, who was gang-raped by six white men in Alabama, the men were never found guilty of any charges and released from jail with minimal fines.

The attack
On May 2, 1959, four white men, William Collinsworth, Ollie Stoutamire, Patrick Scarborough, and David Beagles, set out together to find a woman to sexually assault. They approached a car at Jake Gaither Park armed with shotguns and switchblades. Patrick Scarborough pressed his shotgun against the African American driver's nose and ordered the occupants out of the car. Four African Americans stepped out of the car, two men and two women. All four people in the car were students at Florida A&M University (FAMU). Scarborough forced the two black men to kneel on the ground, and David Beagles held the two black women at knifepoint. Scarborough ordered the black men, Richard Brown and Thomas Butterfield, to leave and they slowly drove away.

The two black women left at the hands of the four white men were Edna Richardson and Betty Jean Owens. Edna Richardson broke free of the men and ran into a nearby park, leaving Betty Jean Owens alone with her attackers. Beagles promised to release her only if she did what they wanted her to do. They drove her to the edge of town and subsequently raped her seven times. Edna Richardson and the other two male students were able to make it back to their car and went to the local police station to report what had happened to them. The officer on duty that night was a nineteen-year-old intern, Joseph D. Cooke, Jr.  To the surprise of many people, he called for back up and searched for Owens. The officer spotted the assailant's car and a chase ensued. Eventually, the men pulled their car over and the muffled screams of Owens could be heard from the car. She was bound and gagged on the backseat floorboard.

The four men were then arrested and taken to jail. The four men did not take their arrest seriously and joked with each other on the way to jail.  All four men confessed in writing to having abducted Owens at gunpoint and raping her.

Reactions to the rape

After FAMU students learned of the attack on Owens, a small group planned an armed march to city hall. This armed march would symbolize their protection of black womanhood with guns as the whites protected white womanhood. Other student leaders argued against an armed march and instead planned a “Unity” demonstration. Fifteen hundred students entered the Lee Auditorium to demand justice for Owens, and the student leaders announced that they would petition the governor for a "speedy and impartial trial". The following day, over a thousand students gathered with signs and prayers that were broadcast over news media. Many of these students connected the events to other issues in the struggle for black freedom, such as the desegregation issues in Little Rock, Arkansas. These students held up posters with scenes from Little Rock that read, "My God How Much More of This Can We Take". Even the BBC broadcast segments of the FAMU student demonstrations. As a result of prominent media coverage, student protests, and a threat to boycott classes, Judge W. May Walker called together a grand jury into special session on May 6, 1959.

The trial
More than 200 black spectators entered the courtroom that day to watch the trial. A nurse accompanied Owens because she was still undergoing treatment for injuries as well as depression. All four men pled not guilty, to the shock of the spectators in the courtroom. The innocence pleas made a jury trial mandatory. This case was significant because, for the first time in Florida, a judge sent white defendants charged with raping a black woman to jail to await their trial. Previously, Florida had never executed a white man for raping a black woman, and many thought that this could be the trial to change that.

Attitudes about the trial varied among black leaders. Ella Baker, the director the Southern Christian Leadership Conference, felt that the evidence in the case was so strong that the jury could not fail to convict. Elijah Muhammad, leader of the Nation of Islam, said that the four rapists destroyed the "virginity of our daughters". Furthermore, he explained that "Appeals for justice will avail us nothing... We know there is no justice under the American flag." The Pittsburgh Courier wrote that the trial would most likely end in acquittal, although the case was "as open and shut as a case can be." Following the indictment of the four men, Martin Luther King Jr., expressed praise for the FAMU student protesters. King explained that they gave "hope to all of us who struggle for human dignity and equal justice."

On June 12, 1959, Betty Jean Owens testified on her own behalf in front of 400 witnesses. She retold the events of the attack to the jury in detail. She told the jury, “I was so scared, but there was nothing I could do with four men, a knife, and a gun ... I couldn’t do anything but what they said.” The defence attorneys worked diligently to prove that Owens had consented to the attack and argued that if a rape did occur that she would have sustained more serious injuries. The doctors that treated Owens told the jury that her injuries resulted in a five-day hospital stay and that she was in a terrible condition. When the prosecution rested its case, the defence attorneys claimed that the state had failed to do anything but prove sexual intercourse had occurred and called for a judgment of acquittal.  Judge Walker denied the motion and the defence was set to return the next day to present their case.

The defense attorney claimed that the boys were intoxicated and that their taped confessions were inadmissible. However, under cross-examination, David Beagles admitted that his confession was voluntary. The defence tried to present the men as reputable and incapable of committing such a heinous crime. In another attempt to sway the jury, they characterized Owens as a Jezebel, who therefore could not have been raped. The jury read the verdict out loud: “guilty with a recommendation for mercy.” The “recommendation for mercy” part of the sentence kept the four men from facing the electric chair.  Judge Walker deferred sentencing for 15 days and sent the four men to Raiford prison, now Florida State Prison. On June 15, 1959, Judge Walker sentenced all four men to life in prison. Following the sentence, Owens told reporters, “I feel better now for the first time since it happened. For the first time, I feel safe.”

Later years
In 1965, David Beagles was paroled. Four years after he was released, he tracked down an African American woman that he thought was Owens, murdered her and buried her in a shallow grave. However, he had murdered Betty Jean Robinson Houston, a different woman. He spent the rest of his life in prison.

See also 

 Recy Taylor
 Rape in the United States
 Fannie Lou Hamer
 Viola Liuzzo
 Joan Little

References

External links 
 
 

Living people
Crimes in Florida
Incidents of violence against women
1940 births